The 1919 Michigan Event refers to a possible meteor air burst on the evening of November 26, 1919, over far northern Indiana and southern Michigan in the United States.

Overview
Shortly before 8:00 pm (local time) on November 26, 1919, dozens of eyewitnesses throughout northern Indiana and southern Michigan reported seeing a "brilliant meteor" traveling westward toward Lake Michigan; the meteor was widely reported as both extremely colorful and producing audible sounds. The meteor was also sighted in more distant locations, including Newberry, Michigan, within the state's Upper Peninsula, Lucknow, Ontario, and across Lake Michigan in Milwaukee, Wisconsin. The shockwave from the meteor created earthquake-like tremors which caused damage to telephone lines, telegraph lines, and electrical infrastructure.

Selected eyewitness reports

William Herbert Hobbs recorded this account from Leroy Milhan, from Centreville, Michigan:
 

Coast Guard stations on the eastern shoreline of Lake Michigan reported the following:
 

Hobbs recorded this account from L. L. Hamilton from Decatur, Michigan, who was driving west of Dowagiac, Michigan:

Impact Location
Newspaper accounts in the following days widely quoted a Grand Haven, Michigan lighthouse keeper, who claimed that the meteor impacted Lake Michigan. A subsequent analysis by geologist William Herbert Hobbs, published by the Michigan Academy of Science, Arts, and Letters, suggested that these reports may have been exaggerated. Hobbs interviewed witnesses throughout Michigan and northern Indiana and determined that the majority of the meteor likely exploded in the air near Pokagon, Michigan. While Hobbs was initially optimistic about finding fragments of the meteor based on his analysis of its flight path, none were ever located.

References 

Meteorite falls
Meteorites found in the United States